Christelle Chobet (born 22 April 1986) is a French rugby union player. She represented  at the 2014 Women's Rugby World Cup. She was in the squad that toured the United States in a successful three test series in 2013.

References

1986 births
Living people
French female rugby union players
Place of birth missing (living people)